WWiSE may refer to:

World-Wide Spectrum Efficiency, an industry group formed espousing an approach to achieving next-generation wireless technologies.
Audiokinetic Wwise, audio editing tools and runtime for games.